Maria Rosa Marco Poquet (born 21 June 1939), better known by her stage name Salomé, is a Spanish singer.

Salomé was born in Barcelona, Spain. She was one of the four winners of the Eurovision Song Contest 1969 with the song "Vivo cantando".

Biography 
She began her career in Radio Barcelona. Since then, she has continued her musical career combining it with television appearances as hostess. She has performed as opening act for Frank Sinatra. By 1963 she had recorded more than forty songs for record companies Iberofón and Zafiro. In 1963 she won the 5th Festival de la Canción Mediterránea de Barcelona music contest with her song in Catalan, "Se'n va anar".

Four years later, in 1967, she won the second prize on the 9th Festival de la Canción Mediterránea de Barcelona with her song in Catalan Com el vent. She also competed in the Festival de Valencia and Festival del Duero where she won the best singer prize. In 1969 se married Sebastián García. She recorded many songs in both Catalan and Spanish, the most popular ones being "Quinientas millas", "L'arbre", "Bésame mucho", "Com el vent", "L'emigrant", "Puedo morir mañana", "Isla del amor" and "Esperaré".

She represented Spain at the Eurovision Song Contest 1969 in Madrid with the song "Vivo cantando", composed by María José Cerato and lyrics by Aniano Alcalde. She shared the first prize with Lulu (UK), Frida Boccara (France), and Lenny Kuhr (Netherlands), the only time in the history of the contest when the prize was won by more than one contestant. She received the prize from the previous Eurovision winner, Spanish singer Massiel. Her dress was designed by Manuel Pertegaz, it weighed 14 kg and it was made of small chalk blue porcelain cylinders wearing also three 1-kg necklaces. Salomé recorded "Vivo cantando" in eight languages (Spanish, Catalan, Basque, French, German, Italian, English and Serbo-Croatian).

References

External links
 
 Lyrics: "Vivo Cantando" (as performed in the contest)

1939 births
Living people
Spanish women singers
Eurovision Song Contest entrants for Spain
Eurovision Song Contest winners
Eurovision Song Contest entrants of 1969
Singers from Barcelona